Ichon Chongnyon station is a railway station for Ichon County, Kangwon Province, North Korea.

Railway stations in North Korea
Buildings and structures in Kangwon Province